Harold Grant was a football coach.

Harold Grant may also refer to:
Harold Grant, character in Strange Brother
Harold Taylor Wood Grant

See also
Harry Grant (disambiguation)